Ryan Williams (born 10 October 1988) is an Australian rules footballer who played for Port Adelaide Football Club in the Australian Football League (AFL). He also previously played for the Central District Football Club in the South Australian National Football League (SANFL) and joined the Geelong Football Club in the Victorian Football League (VFL) in 2015.

Originally from TAC Cup side Geelong Falcons, Williams was drafted by Port Adelaide at number 83 in the 2006 AFL draft. 

Williams played with SANFL club Central District when not required with Port Adelaide and made his AFL debut against  in 2008. He plays as a small defender.

Williams was delisted by Port Adelaide at the end of the 2008 season.

References

External links

Geelong VFL List

1988 births
Living people
Central District Football Club players
Port Adelaide Football Club players
Port Adelaide Football Club players (all competitions)
Geelong Falcons players
Australian rules footballers from Victoria (Australia)
St Joseph's Football Club players